Attorney General Murray may refer to:

James Murray (Ohio politician) (1830–1881), Attorney General of Ohio
John L. Murray (judge) (born 1943), Attorney General of Ireland

See also
General Murray (disambiguation)